Zeluroides americanus is a species of assassin bug in the family Reduviidae. It is found in Central America and North America.

Subspecies
These three subspecies belong to the species Zeluroides americanus:
 Zeluroides americanus americanus
 Zeluroides americanus colima Lent & Wygodzinsky, 1959
 Zeluroides americanus medianus Lent & Wygodzinsky, 1959

References

Further reading

 

Reduviidae
Articles created by Qbugbot
Insects described in 1948